O Yuki Conjugate (OYC) are an English post-industrial/ambient musical group founded in 1982 in Nottingham by Roger Horberry and Andrew Hulme and still - intermittently - active today. Their music has been variously described as 'ambient', 'fourth world', 'ethnic', 'tribal' and 'dark wave'; the band prefer to call it 'dirty ambient'. They are currently in their fourth incarnation based around Horberry and Hulme. Previous members include Clare Elliot, Tim Horberry, Malcolm McGeorge, Dan Mudford, Pete Woodhead and Rob Jenkins, with Joe Gardiner contributing sax. 

Originally inspired by the spirit and sound of post-punk, they soon started pioneering their own brand of ambient at a time (early 80s) when few people were interested in such a low-key approach. Their debut album 'Scene In Mirage' (a mission 1984) perfectly encapsulated their position: one side was beat driven and 'electronic', the other side was 'organic' and made up of ambient soundscapes. Today their approach to music-making is deliberately eclectic, combining high tech editing, low tech electronics and found instrumentation. 

In May 2017, following a lengthy period of hibernation (a regular feature of the band's career), OYC released a new album called 'Tropic', essentially two long pieces generated out of material recorded during the Equator sessions almost 20 years earlier. As such it is an excellent example of OYC's self-described "wilfully obscure" approach.

Partial discography
 Scene in Mirage a-mission LP, 1984.
 Into Dark Water Final Image LP, 1987.
 Peripheral Vision Ikon video, 1988.
 Primitive (collected works 1983-1987) Staalplaat/Soleilmoon, 1996.
 Peyote Multimood/Projekt, 1991.
 Undercurrents (in Dark Water) Staalplaat/Soleilmoon, 1992.
 Equator Staalplaat, 1994 (Co-produced by Paul Schutze).
 Sunchemical Remixes EP, Staalplaat 1995.
 Circular No 1/ Circular No 2 EP, Syntactic 1997.
 The Euphoria of Disobedience OYC Limited, 2006.
 OYC25 Soleilmoon, 2009.
 Ambiguism 1983-1987 Vinyl On Demand, 2011
 Tropic Aufabwegen, 2017
 Sleepwalker Aufabwegen, 2019

External links
 O Yuki Conjugate, official website
 O Yuki Conjugate Bandcamp page
 Aufabwegen Records
 Solieilmoon Records
 [ biography and discography at AllMusic]
 Reviews of Peyote at Projekt.com

English electronic music groups
British ambient music groups
British dark wave musical groups
Soleilmoon artists
Musical groups established in 1982
1982 establishments in England